The 2021 Reese's 150 was the 20th and final stock car race of the 2021 ARCA Menards Series, and the 21st iteration of the event. The race was held on Saturday, October 23, 2021 in Kansas City, Kansas at Kansas Speedway, a  permanent paved oval-shaped racetrack. The race took 102 laps to complete due to an overtime finish. On the final restart on lap 101, Nick Sanchez of Rev Racing would take the lead to win his first career ARCA Menards Series win and his only win of the season. Meanwhile, Ty Gibbs of Joe Gibbs Racing, who finished 2nd, would win the 2021 ARCA Menards Series championship after taking the green flag, who won by 37 points over Corey Heim. To fill out the podium, Rajah Caruth of Rev Racing would finish third.

Background 

Kansas Speedway is a 1.5-mile (2.4 km) tri-oval race track in the Village West area near Kansas City, Kansas, United States. It was built in 2001 and it currently hosts two annual NASCAR race weekends. The IndyCar Series also held races at the venue until 2011. The speedway is owned and operated by NASCAR.

Entry list

Practice 
The only 45-minute practice session was held on Saturday, October 23, at 11:00 AM CST.

Qualifying 
Qualifying was held on Saturday, October 23, at 12:45 PM EST. Each driver would have two laps to set their fastest lap; whichever lap was fastest would be considered their official lap time.

Full qualifying results

Race results

References 

2021 ARCA Menards Series
NASCAR races at Kansas Speedway
Reese's 150
Reese's 150